Ustaz Hassan Saad is a Malaysian politician. He was elected Perikatan Nasional MP for Baling in the 2022 general election.

See also
 Members of the Dewan Rakyat, 15th Malaysian Parliament

References

Living people
Members of the 15th Malaysian Parliament
21st-century Malaysian politicians
Malaysian Islamic Party politicians
Year of birth missing (living people)
Place of birth missing (living people)